Sisca Kohl (born August 23, 2000) is an Indonesian internet celebrity. She and her sister Aliyyah, who are Chinese Indonesians, are mostly known for being content-creators on TikTok since 2018.

Most of their content is filmed in their house which features an elevator, billiard room and a gym. Their videos have attracted significant attention for flaunting their wealth and displaying high amounts of money, such as selling nasi goreng for 400 million rupiah and purchasing expensive imported food. They also went viral for turning different kinds of food (BTS Meal, nasi padang and peking duck) into ice cream.

Sisca first started making make-up videos, however her food reviews yielded higher user numbers. Her unique edited voice sets her apart from other YouTubers, and the phrases such as mari kita coba ( let's try it) are now associated with her brand.

Her content is similar to other Indonesian internet celebrities such as Jessica Jane (sister of Jess No Limit). Her secretive nature has led to speculation regarding her possible family relatives.

References 

Living people
Indonesian Internet celebrities
Indonesian YouTubers
Indonesian people of Chinese descent
People from Jakarta
2000 births